Pili and Mili was a comic acting duo composed of  twins Aurora and Pilar Bayona (born February 10, 1947 in Zaragoza, Aragon, Spain). They rose to fame in early 1960s, becoming one of the biggest stars of the "child prodigy" movie genre that enjoyed a boom at the time. Their movies were musical comedies based on the same formula of mistaken identities.

During the shooting of their first film, the choreographer offered them tablets in case they were tired. In 1968 they appeared in Dos gemelas estupendas.

The twins were very popular in Spain, Mexico and Italy, but their career was short, lasting only from 1963 to 1970. When the success formula ceased to work, the duo dissolved. Mili retired aged 22 but Pili continued.

Filmography as Pili y Mili

Cinema 
 1963: Como dos gotas de agua (dir. by Luis César Amadori). 
 1964: Dos chicas locas, locas (dir. by Pedro Lazaga). 
 1965: Whisky y vodka (dir. by Fernando Palacios).
 1965: Sharp-Shooting Twin Sisters (dir. by Rafael Romero Marchent). 
 1966: Scandal in the Family (dir. by Julio Porter). 
 1967: Un novio para dos hermanas (dir. by Luis César Amadori). 
 1968: Dos gemelas estupendas (dir. by Miguel Morayta Martínez).
 1968: Agáchate, que disparan (dir. by Manuel Esteba). 
 1969: Princesa y vagabunda (dir. by Miguel Morayta Martínez).
 1970: La guerra de las monjas (dir. by José María Fernández Unsáin)

Television 
1965: Sábado ´64

Pilar's solo filmography 
After the duo dissolved, Pilar continued a television career in Spain and Mexico alone. She also played in theater and appeared in a number of small roles in cinema.
 1979: Los fieles sirvientes (dir. by Francesc Betriú)
 1985: En penumbra (dir. by J. L. Lozano)

Read more

References

External links 
 
 

People from Zaragoza
Twin performers
Spanish twins
Spanish comedy duos
Female characters in film
Comedy film characters
Film characters introduced in 1963
Spanish film actresses
Spanish television actresses
1947 births
Living people
Mili, Pili and